Ahmadabad (also Romanized as Aḩmadābād; also known as Allāhābād) is a village in Ernan Rural District, in the Central District of Mehriz County, Yazd Province, Iran. At the 2006 census, its population was 147, in 44 families.

References 

Populated places in Mehriz County